The 2004 National Leagues ( known as the LHF Healthplan National Leagues due to sponsorship) are the second, third and fourth divisions of rugby league in the UK.

National League One
National League One was won by Leigh Centurions, and won promotion to the Super League after defeating runners-up Whitehaven in the play-off final. Keighley Cougars were relegated to National League Two.

Table

Play-offs

National League Two
National League Two was won by Barrow Raiders, and were automatically promoted to National League One. York City Knights reached the play-off final, but lost to Halifax, who retained their National League One status.

Table

National League Three
National League Three expanded to a 14-team league, but there was still no automatic promotion and relegation with National League Two. The league was won by Coventry Bears, who also went on to win the play-offs.

Table

Play-offs

Week 1
Bradford Dudley Hill 13–30 St Albans Centurions

Coventry Bears 32–26 Birmingham Bulldogs

Sheffield Hillsborough Hawks 38–6 Bramley Buffaloes

Woolston Rovers (Warrington) 36–32 Hemel Stags

Week 2
Sheffield Hillsborough Hawks 26–40 Bradford Dudley Hill

St Albans Centurions 18–26 Bramley Buffaloes

Week 3 
Coventry Bears 32–18 Bramley Buffaloes

Woolston Rovers (Warrington) 32–18 Bradford Dudley Hill

Grand Final
Coventry Bears 48–24 Woolston Rovers (Warrington)

References

External links
Rugby Football League

See also
Rugby League Championships

RFL League 1
Rugby Football League Championship
Rugby League National Leagues